Kirit Premjibhai Solanki  (b 1950) is an Indian Politician and medical practitioner (laparoscopic surgeon) who has been elected Member of Parliament of India for three consecutive terms (15th, 16th and 17th Lok Sabha). He represents the Ahmedabad West constituency of Gujarat and is a member of the Bharatiya Janata Party political party. Currently, he has been appointed as the chairman of the Parliamentary Committee on the Welfare of Scheduled Castes and Scheduled Tribes. He is also part of the panel of chairpersons who preside over the House in the absence of the Speaker and the Deputy Speaker. He is one of the most active members in the parliament and had nearly 100% attendance in the 15th and 16th Lok Sabha. He has been awarded the Shreshth Sansad Award consecutively twice in 2018 and 2019 for his active work in the parliament and constituency.

Early life and education
Kirit Solanki was born in village Kamboi, Gujarat. He is a doctor by profession and holds MBBS, MS and FICS degrees.  Before joining politics, he worked as a professor of surgery for almost 38 years. He also served as the elected President of the Gujarat State Surgeons Association for the year 2011-2012.

Education

Educated at:

 Smt. N.H.L. Municipal Medial College, Ahmedabad
 B.J. Medical College and Civil Hospital, Ahmedabad; and 
 Fellow of International College of Surgeon

Political career and Election results

Elections 
Kirit Solanki, is the first elected Member of Parliament from the Ahmedabad West constituency. This constituency was earlier a part of Ahmedabad constituency and came into existence in 2008 as a part of the implementation of delimitation of parliamentary constituencies.

Parliamentary activity 
Dr. Solanki has been an active parliamentarian with a high attendance of 97% when the National Average is 80%. He has participated in 333 debates of the Parliament when the National Average is 67.1. He has also asked 416 questions and proposed 37 Private Member's Bills. He is very much interested in private member bills and as he ranks as the second highest to raise the private member's bills in the Parliament. Dr. Solanki has raised some vital issues in Parliament regarding his constituency Ahmadabad West and issues affecting the people of Scheduled Caste and Scheduled Tribes (SC/ST), healthcare, education and other important national issues etc.

He actively participates in debates with respect to health care sector in India and often shares his rich personal experience as a doctor.

Debates Participated:

 Welfare of Scheduled Caste and Scheduled Tribes
 Illegal immigration of Bangladeshis
 Need for research on thalassemia gene therapy
 Health care issues of tribal
 Rising mob lynching incidents
 Ill behavior meted to people from the north-eastern states

Key Private Member Bills:

 The Real Estate (Regulation and Development) Amendment Bill 2018
 The Right to Play Sports Bill 2018
 The Compulsory Mental Healthcare Counselling Facilities in Government Schools Bill, 2016
 The Tuberculosis (Prevention and Control) Bill 2017
 The National Witness Protection Bill 2016
 Rainwater (Harvesting and Storage) Bill 2016

Posts Held

See also

15th Lok Sabha
Politics of India
Parliament of India
Government of India
Ahmedabad West (Lok Sabha constituency)
Bharatiya Janata Party

References 

India MPs 2009–2014
India MPs 2014–2019
Lok Sabha members from Gujarat
People from Patan district
People from Ahmedabad district
1950 births
Living people
Bharatiya Janata Party politicians from Gujarat
Dr. B. C. Roy Award winners
India MPs 2019–present